Rudolph "Rudy" Bradley (born May 16, 1946) is a Florida politician. A Democrat turned Republican, he served in the Florida House of Representatives from 1994 to 2000, representing parts of Pinellas and Manatee Counties as the Representative for the 55th District.

Early life
Bradley was born in St. Petersburg, Florida, in the Gas Plant neighborhood. He was the first black athlete at the University of Tampa, and earned a scholarship in 1966 before graduating in 1969. He earned a master's degree in social work.

He has four children, Adia, Ernest, Michael, and Andre.

Career
He returned to St. Petersburg and was a social worker in Pinellas County Schools for more than 20 years.

Bradley was initially elected in a special election to replace Doug Jamerson after his appointment as Florida Commissioner of Education. In the Democratic primary, he came first in a five person race. He won the General Election with 71.9% of votes.

In his 1996 campaign, he was unopposed for reelection.

While in the House, Bradley sponsored a measure to create $3-million in college scholarships for minority teachers. "I stand behind what the voters of District 55 have told me, resoundingly. . .that education and economic development will resolve the issues of crime."

Bradley was a speaker at the 2000 Republican National Convention.

References

Republican Party members of the Florida House of Representatives
African-American state legislators in Florida
1946 births
Living people
20th-century American politicians
University of Michigan alumni